The Honda CR-V (also sold as the Honda Breeze in China since 2019) is a compact crossover SUV manufactured by the Japanese automaker Honda since 1995. The early models were built using the same platform as the Civic.

Honda began producing the CR-V in Sayama, Japan, and Swindon, United Kingdom, for worldwide markets, adding North American manufacturing sites in East Liberty, Ohio, United States, in 2007; El Salto, Jalisco, Mexico, in late 2007 (ended in early 2017); Alliston, Ontario, Canada, in 2012; and Greensburg, Indiana, United States, in February 2017. The CR-V is also produced in Wuhan for the Chinese market by Dongfeng Honda, and also marketed as the Breeze in China for the version produced at Guangzhou by Guangqi Honda.

Honda states "CR-V" stands for "Comfortable Runabout Vehicle," while the term "Compact Recreational Vehicle" is used in a British car review article that was republished by Honda.

, the CR-V is positioned between the smaller ZR-V (marketed as HR-V in North America) and the larger North American market Passport/Pilot or the Chinese market Avancier/UR-V. It is currently Honda's best-selling vehicle in the world, and the second best-selling SUV globally in 2020.



First generation (1995) 

The first generation CR-V or RD1 was Honda's first in-house designed sport utility vehicle by Hiroyuki Kawase. For the North American market, it was displayed at the 1996 Chicago Auto Show and went on sale in February 1997.

Outer dimensions for this engine would be identical to the Integra's 1.8L engine, but internally the engine had a larger  bore vs  for the Integra, to add the extra displacement needed to produce more torque. The engine used a one-piece cylinder sleeve construction unique from any other B-series engine. The chassis was a unibody design with fully independent suspension. The front suspension was double-wishbone, while the rear used a trailing arm-based multilink system. Inside, the rear seats were able to fold down, and a picnic table was stowed in the rear floor area. All models featured plastic cladding covering the front bumper, rear bumper, and fender wells. In most countries, CR-Vs had a chrome grille; however, in the United States, the grille was made out of the same black plastic as the bumpers. The EX included anti-lock brakes and 15-inch alloy wheels over the LX trim. Drivetrain options were front-wheel drive or Honda's Real Time AWD.

Indonesian market CR-V was released in 1999 as a locally assembled model. Honda customized the model for sale to include a face-to-face third-row seating, making it a seven-seater vehicle to take advantage of the tax regulations in the country. The rear foglamp was also re-configured as a fourth and fifth brake light.

Facelift

In 1999, for the 2000 model year, the European, Australian and Asian CR-V models featured more drastic changes. Exterior alterations included a new front bumper, smoothed off rear bumper, and a smaller plastic radio antenna on the rear of the roof. "Nighthawk Black" was added to the list of paint choices, while "Passion Orange" disappeared. New dark blue pearl and red pearl shades replaced the former solid red and metallic blue hues. European models received an enlarged Honda emblem on the front grille, and a new metallic yellow paint in certain markets.

This improved performance for the  vehicle. Fuel economy of  city/ highway (US) and price were not affected by the increase in power, which was the result of a higher compression ratio (9.6:1 compared to the B20B's 8.8:1), a new intake manifold, and slightly higher lift on the intake valves. This 16 percent increase in power resulted to a faster 0-60 mph of 8.6 seconds on the 5-speed manual 4wd.

In 2000, an SE (Special Edition) model was introduced in North America. The SE featured body-colored bumpers and side moldings, a body-colored hard spare tire cover, leather upholstery, CD/cassette audio deck, rear privacy glass, and chrome grille accent. Until 2001, the CR-V sold more than any other vehicle in its class. The North American models also received new exterior colors including Naples Gold Metallic and Taffeta White. Electron Blue was introduced in 2000 to replace Submarine Blue Pearl, while Satin Silver Metallic replaced Sebring Silver Metallic in 2001. However, that year, sales of the Ford Escape and its clone, the Mazda Tribute, surpassed those of the CR-V.

The Australian higher specification model was called the "Sport". It was added at the time of the first facelift and included body-colored bumpers, mirrors, door handles, and hard rear spare wheel cover. It also included alloy wheels, roof rails, and a large glass sunroof. The CR-V became the country's best-selling SUV in 2000, outselling the Toyota Land Cruiser for the first time.

Safety
The 1997–2001 model tested by the Insurance Institute for Highway Safety (IIHS) was the LX model with standard driver and passenger airbags. The car's structure received an acceptable rating, and the overall car received a marginal rating — as the dummy's left leg would have been broken. In addition to this lower body injury, the dummy's head went through the airbag which may have caused a minor concussion. The chest was well protected.

Models equipped with an automatic transmission now had an overdrive cancel button that allowed the driver to lock the transmission in the first three gears to provide power for passing and climbing grades, known as "Grade Logic." The pattern of the cloth on the seats was also redesigned, and the head restraints earned an acceptable rating from the IIHS for whiplash protection.

Second generation (2001) 

The second generation CR-V, which went on sale on November 12, 2001 was a full redesign, based on the seventh generation Civic, and powered by the K24A1 engine., or the K20A4 engine in South East Asia. The new CR-V retained the fuel economy of the previous model because of the i-VTEC system. The second generation CR-V was Car and Driver magazine's Best Small SUV for 2002 and 2003.

Second generation CR-Vs in countries outside of North America were again offered in both "low specification" and "high specification" variants, with the latter featuring body-colored bumpers and fittings. It also now did not require the glass hatch to be opened before the swinging door. Changes between model years 2002, 2003, and 2004 were minor, involving an enlargement of the center compartment bin and the addition of a front passenger door power lock in the latter two years respectively. The Honda FR-V was based upon the second generation CR-V.

In China, a clone from Shuanghuan Auto, called the Laibao S-RV, became a center of a design rights controversy, because the latter appeared to be a blatant copy of Honda's design.

Facelift

In 2004, for the 2005 model year, the CR-V received a mid-cycle refresh. New 16-inch wheels replaced the previous 15-inch versions. Changes included new taillights and headlights with clear indicators and two separate H1 bulbs for low beams and high beams, the previous setup used H4 single bulb for both low and high beams. The taillights now used clear lenses instead of amber for the turning indicators. The grille was also changed; it had two horizontal bars instead of one. The front bumper design was slightly changed, it now has round fog lights compared to the previous trapezium fog lights and in addition to the lower grill there are two horizontal bars instead of one. The rear bumper reflectors were longer and narrower.

On the inside of the car, the EX trim received upgrades which included steering wheel-mounted audio controls, an outside temperature monitor and also an electric sunroof. The stereo system was also XM Satellite Radio ready (USA but not Canada). All CR-V models also had revised rear seat headrests, which had been redesigned to reduce rear view blockage.

Mechanically, the 2005 model was also changed. A major change included a drive-by-wire throttle for all CR-Vs. The all-wheel drive system was improved; it had been tuned to activate faster in low traction situations. US market models were equipped with a five-speed automatic, as opposed to the previous four-speed automatic.

In the United States and Canada, all 2005 MY and later CR-Vs have anti-lock brakes, electronic brake force distribution, traction control and Vehicle Stability Assist, front seat-mounted side airbags, and side-curtain airbags with rollover sensors for all occupants.

In Australia, the MY05 facelift went on sale in late 2004. Base models made do with only dual airbags and ABS as standard equipment, while the Sport came equipped with side airbags for the first time. Curtain airbags were unavailable on any model, until the next generation.

Following the tradition of adding a trim level above the EX during the refresh like the first generation CR-V, Honda added the SE trim level for the 2005 CR-V. The CR-V SE featured painted bumpers, body side molding, and hard, body-colored spare tire cover. Honda introduced leather seats for the first time to the CR-V with this trim, as well as a leather-wrapped steering wheel, heated side mirrors, and front seats.

Australia
This iteration of CR-V arrived in Australia in January 2002, and initially came in separate guises, consisting that of the "Base" & "Sport". The "CR-V" (or "Base"), consisted of, but not limited of, dual front airbags, air conditioning, power windows and mirrors, as well as a CD player. Building upon "CR-V" specification, The Sport added ABS, Cruise Control, a sunroof, 15 inch alloy wheels, front foglights, as well as body coloured bumpers and mirrors. Consistently selling very well within the Medium SUV segment within the previous generation, amassing over 40,000 units between 1997 and 2001, the second generation continued its success, with it becoming the best selling SUV in 2002, selling over 12,000 units.

Several "Special Edition" models were released, beginning in 2003. The "Winter Classic" & "Sport Winter Classic" were sold in Winter/Spring 2003. Building upon the "Base", Winter Classic added alloy wheels, side steps, as well as a tow bar, while the Sport Winter Classic gained roof racks, nudge bar and foglights, however, did without the towbar. Later within this iteration, in 2005, an SE model was launched, featuring rear parking sensors, nudge bar and 16' alloy wheels. It was sold between October and November 2005. Running throughout 2006, the CR-V "Extra" brought with it 16 inch alloy wheels and side airbags.

Philippines 
In the Philippines, the second-generation CR-V was released in 2002. The vehicle was reconfigured to seat 10 people, with 3 in front, 4 in the second row, and 3 in the third row to take advantage of the tax regulations in the country at the time which allows a 10-seater vehicle to be classified as a "mass transport van", therefore exempt from excise tax. The 10-seater configuration also allowed the vehicle to compete with Asian utility vehicles (AUV), while 5-seater and 8-seater variants are also available. It was produced locally at the factory in Santa Rosa, Laguna with 63 percent of local content. In its 4-year production run, Honda sold 20,886 units of the second-generation CR-V.

Engines

Third generation (2006) 

The third generation CR-V went on sale in the U.S. in late September 2006 for the 2007 model year. Unlike preceding models, it features a rear liftgate rather than a side-opening rear door and no longer has the spare tire mounted on the rear door.

The third generation CR-V is powered by Honda's standard K-series 2.4L inline-four engine. A 2.2L i-CTDI diesel engine was offered in the European and Asian markets. The European market CR-V had the R20A 2.0L gasoline engine, based on the Honda R-series i-VTEC SOHC engine found in the Honda Civic, as opposed to the previous CR-V offering the K20A.

Facelift

In 2009 for the 2010 model year in North America, the CR-V received design, powertrain and equipment changes. Changes included a redesigned front fascia with a new horizontal-slat chrome grille and honeycomb-designed lower front grille, new front bumper, and revised tail lights. The rear bumper was redesigned, as well as new  alloy wheels. The interior received minor changes, including seat fabrics, as well as wider driver and front-passenger armrests. The audio head unit controls were altered and the information display backlighting in the gauges was changed to blue, instead of the previous black.

Fourth generation (2011) 

The CR-V Concept debuted at the Orange County International Auto Show in September 2011, the production 2012 CR-V debuted at the 2011 Los Angeles Auto Show. The CR-V went on sale in the U.S. on 15 December 2011.

It is powered by a 2.4-liter i-VTEC inline-four engine that puts out 185hp and 163 pound-feet (220 Nm) of torque at 4,400 rpm along with an all-new Real-Time all-wheel-drive (AWD) with intelligent control system. All North American CR-Vs come equipped with a 5-speed automatic transmission.

Facelift

The facelifted 2015 model year CR-V went on sale during October 2014. The CR-V uses the direct injected Earth Dreams engine and continuously variable transmission (CVT) combination first introduced on the ninth generation Accord, EPA estimated fuel economy is improved +4/+3/+3 mpg (city/highway/combined). The structure has been modified to improve crash performance, particularly in the IIHS's small offset crash test. The suspension shock absorbers, springs, anti-roll bars and lower control arms are also revised to improve ride performance, while a reduced 15.6:1 steering gear ratio and larger brake booster gives it a sportier feel.

Fifth generation (2016) 

The fifth generation CR-V was unveiled on 13 October 2016 in Detroit. Sales began in the U.S. on 21 December 2016 as a 2017 model year. It uses the same Honda compact global platform introduced on the tenth generation Civic. Honda began producing the CR-V at East Liberty, Ohio (ELP) in November 2016 and at Greensburg, Indiana (HMIN) during February 2017. It is available with an optional 7-seater variant in markets other than North America.

In October 2019, Guangqi Honda in China began marketed the model with a different styling as the Honda Breeze which was sold alongside the international facelift version CR-V produced by Dongfeng Honda.

Facelift 

Honda unveiled a refreshed CR-V in September 2019 for the 2020 model year, initially for the North American market. For the first time in North America, the refreshed model introduced a hybrid powertrain as an option. Additionally, the CR-V's suite of advanced safety features are standard on every trim level, meaning even the most affordable CR-V provides adaptive cruise control and the latest crash prevention technology.

Sixth generation (2022) 
 
The sixth-generation CR-V was introduced on 12 July 2022. The prototype design and production process was done in Ontario, Canada before being shared worldwide.

The second-row seats received  more legroom and can also recline up to 10.5 degrees.  The seats also add rear side torso airbags and outboard seatbelt pretensioners.  The front driver's seat no longer offers the 4-way lumbar height adjustment.

The sixth-generation CR-V went on sale in September 2022 for the 2023 model year in the U.S. The U.S. model is offered in EX, EX-L, Sport, and Sport Touring trim levels, which the hybrid powertrain is standard on latter two trims. The Canadian model is offered in LX, Sport, EX-L, and Touring trims, with the Touring having the hybrid powertrain.

Unlike previous generations, it is not offered in Japan due to low sales of the fifth-generation model, and was indirectly replaced by the smaller ZR-V.

The sixth-generation CR-V is produced and sold in China by Dongfeng Honda. A variant with a different front and rear fascias is produced and sold by Guangqi Honda as the second-generation Honda Breeze, which was launched on 13 December 2022.

The sixth-generation CR-V was launched in Thailand on 20 March 2023, three days prior to the 44th Bangkok International Motor Show. It is available in E, ES 4WD, EL 4WD, e:HEV ES and e:HEV RS 4WD.

Sales

Other markets

References

External links

 Official website

CR-V
Cars introduced in 1995
2000s cars
2010s cars
2020s cars
Compact sport utility vehicles
Crossover sport utility vehicles
Front-wheel-drive vehicles
All-wheel-drive vehicles
Hybrid sport utility vehicles
Plug-in hybrid vehicles
Partial zero-emissions vehicles
Vehicles with CVT transmission
Motor vehicles manufactured in the United States